James R. Black III (November 4, 1956 – December 30, 2018) was an American football defensive end. He played for the Pittsburgh Maulers of the United States Football League (USFL) in 1984, and for the Kansas City Chiefs of the National Football League (NFL) as a replacement player in 1987.

College career
Black played college football for South Carolina State, and played with Harry Carson in 1974.

Professional career
In the American Football Association, Black played with the Alabama Vulcans in 1979, and West Virginia Rockets in 1980. He signed with the Calgary Stampeders of the Canadian Football League (CFL) in 1980, and was released on June 6, 1980.

Black signed with the Washington Redskins of the NFL on May 6, 1981, but was released shortly after and signed with the Kansas City Chiefs. He was placed on injured reserve by the Chiefs during training camp on August 18, 1981. He was later waived with an injury settlement before the start of the season. Black played for the Toronto Argonauts of the Canadian Football League (CFL) in 1981.

Black re-signed with the Chiefs, but was waived on August 5, 1982. Black signed with the Denver Gold of the United States Football League (USFL) on December 22, 1982. He was released on February 4, 1983. He signed with the New Orleans Saints of the NFL on May 5, 1983, and was released on August 9, 1983. Black signed with the Pittsburgh Maulers of the USFL on October 5, 1983. He was released on March 4, 1984.

Black signed with the Kansas City Chiefs as a replacement player during the 1987 NFL season on September 23, 1987. He suffered a knee sprain and was placed on injured reserve on October 9.

Personal
Black died on December 30, 2018, due to congestive heart failure.

References

External links
JustSportsStats.com statistics

1956 births
2018 deaths
People from Xenia, Ohio
Players of American football from Ohio
American football defensive ends
South Carolina State Bulldogs football players
Calgary Stampeders players
Washington Redskins players
Kansas City Chiefs players
Toronto Argonauts players
Denver Gold players
New Orleans Saints players
Pittsburgh Maulers players
National Football League replacement players